The 2005 South Australian National Football League (SANFL) Grand Final saw the Central District Bulldogs defeat Woodville-West Torrens by 28 points to claim the club's fifth premiership victory.

The match was played on Sunday 2 October 2005 at Football Park in front of a crowd of 28,637.

References 

SANFL Grand Finals
Sanfl Grand Final, 2005